A Time to Heal is a 1994 TV movie starring Nicollette Sheridan, Gary Cole and Mara Wilson. The TV film was directed by Michael Toshiyuki Uno.

Plot
A mother that has been paralyzed from a stroke during childbirth recovers with the help of her husband.

Cast
 Nicollette Sheridan as Jenny Barton
 Gary Cole as Jay Barton
 Mara Wilson as Barbara Barton
 Annie Corley as Michelle Rogers
 Ken Jenkins as Don Peterson
 Ben Masters as Dr. Klein
 Tim Ransom as Mitch Barton
 Lorraine Toussaint as Zelda
 Doris Roberts as Maddy
 Bryan Clark as Mr. Barton
 Toni Sawyer as Mrs. Barton
 Scott Alan Smith as Dr. Martin
 Trisha Simmons as Nurse Johnson
 Wesley Hayashi as Burt
 Sarah Freeman as Sandra
 Lauren Kopit as Beth

References

External links
 
 

1994 television films
1994 films
American television films
Films directed by Michael Toshiyuki Uno